Kuyucak is a town and a district of Aydın Province in the Aegean region of Turkey,  from the city of Aydın on the E24 highway that connects İzmir and Denizli,  east of İzmir. Kuyucak is near the larger town of Nazilli.

Etymology
The word of Kuyucak probably comes from kuyuçok (means "many wells").

Geography
In the foothills of the Aydın mountains, the economy of Kuyucak is based on agriculture. The mountain districts produce olive oil, while the lowland plain of the Büyük Menderes River produces high quality oranges, figs and cotton.
Kuyucak itself is a small town of 7,200 people. 

Kuyucak has a typical Aegean climate, with hot summers, rainy autumns, chilly winters and sunny springs.

Transportation
There are regular buses from İzmir Adnan Menderes Airport, Nazilli and Denizli (70 km to the west). The town is also on the Izmir-Denizli railway line and there is a daily train service.

History
A few km southeast of Kuyucak lie the ruins of Antioch on the Maeander, an ancient Byzantine city.
Independence day is celebrated on 5 September, the date that Kuyucak was liberated at the end of the Turkish War of Independence.

Places of interest
There are a great many places of historical interest in the Aegean region, including many in the province of Aydın, although not in Kuyucak itself.

Kuyucak in popular culture
 "Kuyucaklı Yusuf" (Yusuf of Kuyucak) is the title of a major novel published in 1937 by Sabahattin Ali about the small-town life in Turkey. The story was made into a film in 1985 by Feyzi Tuna.

References

External links 
 the municipality
 the district governorate

Populated places in Aydın Province
Districts of Aydın Province
Kuyucak District